Petrus de Goscalch (fl. 1378–94) was a composer from the papal choir at Avignon of whom only one composition, "En nul estat", survives in the Chantilly Codex, but who may be significant as the possible author of the third part of The Berkeley Treatise of 1375.

References

Sources
 

Trecento composers
14th-century composers
Year of birth unknown
Year of death unknown